Joseph Sylvester Maher (29 December 1933 – 17 July 1998) was an Irish actor, playwright, and occasionally theatre director. He was best known for his roles in the comedies of Joe Orton. He received three Tony Award nominations for his roles in the plays Spokesong, Night and Day, and Loot, with the last winning him a Drama Desk Award. His other accolades included an Obie Award and a Laurence Olivier Award nomination.

Early life
Maher was born in Westport, County Mayo, Ireland, on 29 December 1933. He was one of ten children born to Delia A. (née O'Malley) and Joseph Maher Sr., a schoolteacher.

Maher immigrated to Canada in 1956 and in his youth worked for an oil company. He started acting with the Canadian Players and performed across Canada for three years before moving to New York.

Career
Maher's Broadway theatre credits include The Prime of Miss Jean Brodie, King Henry V, The Royal Family, Night and Day, and Loot.

Maher's film credits include For Pete's Sake, Heaven Can Wait, Time After Time, Just Tell Me What You Want, I'm Dancing as Fast as I Can, The Evil That Men Do, Frankenweenie, My Stepmother is an Alien, Sister Act, Funny Farm, I.Q., In & Out, The Shadow, Mars Attacks! and The Out-of-Towners.

Maher's appearances on television included roles in the soap operas Guiding Light and Another World. He also guest-starred in several other TV series including M*A*S*H, Wonder Woman, When Things Were Rotten, Ellery Queen, St. Elsewhere, ALF, Gimme a Break!, Moonlighting, Thirtysomething, Murder, She Wrote, Seinfeld, Tales from the Crypt and Chicago Hope.

Death
Maher died of a brain tumor at his home in Los Angeles, California, on 17 July 1998, at age 64. He was buried at Aughaval Cemetery in his hometown of Westport, County Mayo.

Partial filmography

Awards and nominations

Notes

References

External links

Joseph Maher papers, 1960-1998, held by the Billy Rose Theatre Division, New York Public Library for the Performing Arts

1933 births
1998 deaths
Deaths from brain cancer in the United States
Deaths from cancer in California
Drama Desk Award winners
Irish emigrants to the United States
Irish male film actors
Irish male stage actors
Irish male television actors
Irish male voice actors
People from Westport, County Mayo
20th-century Irish male actors